Raynold Kaufgetz (September 4, 1797 in Zurich, Old Swiss Confederacy – March 26, 1869 in Zurich, Swiss Confederation) was a Swiss soldier, politician and economist, best known for devising cyclical fiat currency theory. Kaufgetz was also an amateur biologist and animal breeder.

Family and early life

Valentinus Kaufgetz, Raynold's father, was a professor in Zurich and one of the leading figures in the fight to unify the disparate colleges of the city into the unified University of Zurich. Valentinus was a descendant of Reformed church leader Heinrich Bullinger, and brought his twelve children up in a strict, religious household. Raynold originally intended to study theology at Zurich, but was soon obsessed with the then-burgeoning field of economics.

Military career and academia

After completing his studies at the University of Zurich, Kaufgetz joined the Swiss Army. Although reported to be physically imposing and naturally brave, Kaufgetz joined at a time of national peace and unity. Kaufgetz soon became bored with the military life, and returned to Zurich to take up a post teaching at the University of Zurich.

As an economist he was heavily influenced by Thomas Robert Malthus and many of his theories on domestic economics. Kaufgetz advocated for high tariffs to encourage domestic production of goods, and advocated for a more nationalized Swiss economy. An early proponent of the economic theories of David Ricardo and Adam Smith, he was accused by his fellow academics of being an Anglophile when it came to economics. This criticism would have a lasting effect on his future works, and many of his later theories diverted from strict economics to nationalist, romantic ideas of how a Swiss economy should function in comparison to the other European economies of the time.

Although it was a science in its infancy, Kaufgetz became obsessed with biology. Famously, Kaufgetz attempted to breed a type of cow specifically designed to survive the harsh Swiss climate. Although he failed in his ultimate goal, he is sometimes seen as a Swiss Gregor Mendel. Although he was out of academia by the time On the Origin of Species was published, he was convinced by Charles Darwin's arguments and was working on a German translation of the book at the time of his death.

Sonderbundskrieg and the Swiss federal constitution

At the outbreak of the Sonderbundskrieg on November 3, 1847 Kaufgetz petitioned to have his military commission restored. While qualified for service, Kaufgetz's petition was denied.

Kaufgetz saw it as a deeply personal insult that he was not given a chance to win glory and fight the Catholic cantonments, which he saw as existential threats to Switzerland. Nevertheless, Kaufgetz became a strong advocate for the Swiss Federal Constitution and volunteered to write a draft of the document. While Kaufgetz was once again denied, he wrote a number of letters to leading members of government proposing amendments and lauding their work. It was during this writing campaign that Kaufgetz would strike up a friendship with Guillaume Henri Dufour, which would last until Kaufgetz's death. Conversely, Kaufgetz also struck up an exchange with leading Swiss politician Jonas Furrer. Although they both affiliated with the Radical Party, Furrer took an intense dislike to the economist. With Furrer becoming the first President of the Swiss Confederation in 1848, what little chance Kaufgetz had of a political career was over.

International Red Cross and the Geneva Convention

Due to his friendship with Dufour, Kaufgetz found himself swept up into many of Henry Dunant's projects. Kaufgetz, through Dufour, became an early supporter of the International Red Cross. While he publicly and privately criticized Dunant for making the operating language French as opposed to Kaufgetz's beloved German, he applauded the fact that Roman Catholics were prevented from serving in its governing body.

It was through his support of the Red Cross that Kaufgetz became involved, with Dunant, in advocating for the first Geneva Convention. Although Kaufgetz sought a position in the Swiss delegation to the convention and was denied the opportunity to serve his country yet again, he still supported the final document and wrote several glowing letters to Dunant, praising his accomplishments.

References 

 * 
 Erwin Bucher: Die Geschichte des Sonderbundskrieges. Verlag Berichthaus, Zürich 1966.

1797 births
1869 deaths
Amateur biologists
Swiss economists
People from Zürich
Swiss biologists
Swiss military personnel